Giorgio Lamberti (born 28 January 1969) is an Italian  former swimmer. In 1991 he became the first swimmer of Italy to win a world title, and gold medal, at a FINA World Aquatics Championships. He formerly held world records in the short course and long course 200 metre freestyle as well as in the short course 400 metre freestyle.

Biography
Lamberti was born in Brescia, Lombardy. At six, he was advised to begin swimming to improve his light physique. At 17, in 1986, he won the first of his six Italian championships. He took part in the following 1986 World Aquatics Championships, where he reached the B final in the 200 freestyle, and took part in the Italian 4x200 freestyle relay.

The following year, now coached by Alberto Castagnetti, he established the new short course record at Bonn in the 200 and 400 m freestyle. However, he did not qualify for the finals in the same races at the 1988 Summer Olympic Games later in the year. At the 1989 European LC Championships, held again in Bonn, winning the gold medal in the 100 and 200 m freestyle; in the latter, with 1'46"69, he set the new world record, which remained unbeaten for 10 years, until Grant Hackett improved it at Brisbane in 1999. Lamberti at Bonn won another gold medal in the 4x200 freestyle.

In the 1991 World Aquatics Championships in Perth, Lamberti won the gold medal in the 200 m freestyle, winning also a medal in the 100 m and 4x200 m races. His gold medal in the 200 metre freestyle at the 1991 World Championships made him the first Italian world champion, gold medalist, at a World Aquatics Championships in swimming. In the European Championships held in the same year at Athens, he won a silver medal in the 200 m, behind Artur Wojdat, and a bronze in the 100  (won by Alexander Popov) and 400 m (won by Yevgeny Sadovyi). Lamberti participated in the 1992 Summer Olympics, obtaining a fifth place in the 4x200 m relay as his best results.

After swimming
He retired from professional swimming in 1993, and, from 2003 to 2008, was a member of the city's council of Brescia, with responsibility of sports and recreation. He later held several positions in the Italian Swimming Federation.

On 3 November 2000, he had a son, Michele Lamberti, who also became a competitive swimmer. His son was birthed by his wife, Tanya Vannini, who was also a competitive swimmer. In addition to Michele, his other children are Noemi and Matteo.

Recognition
 In 2004 he was inducted into the International Swimming Hall of Fame.
 Italian swim club Team Veneto designed their swim cap and logo to depict Giorgio Lamberti in honour of his accomplishments for Italian swimming on the global level.

See also
 List of members of the International Swimming Hall of Fame
 Italy national swimming team - Multiple medalists
 Italian record progression 100 metres freestyle
 Italian record progression 200 metres freestyle
 World record progression 200 metres freestyle
 World record progression 400 metres freestyle

References

External links
 
 Giorgio Lamberti on agendadiana.com

1969 births
Living people
Sportspeople from Brescia
Olympic swimmers of Italy
Swimmers at the 1988 Summer Olympics
Swimmers at the 1992 Summer Olympics
World record setters in swimming
Italian male freestyle swimmers
World Aquatics Championships medalists in swimming
European Aquatics Championships medalists in swimming
European champions for Italy
Mediterranean Games gold medalists for Italy
Mediterranean Games bronze medalists for Italy
Swimmers at the 1987 Mediterranean Games
Swimmers at the 1991 Mediterranean Games
Mediterranean Games medalists in swimming
20th-century Italian people
21st-century Italian people